Edward Irving Koch (December 12, 1924February 1, 2013) was an American politician, lawyer, political commentator, film critic, and television personality. He served in the United States House of Representatives from 1969 to 1977 and was mayor of New York City from 1978 to 1989.

Koch was a lifelong Democrat who described himself as a "liberal with sanity". The author of an ambitious public housing renewal program in his later years as mayor, he began by cutting spending and taxes and cutting 7,000 employees from the city payroll. As a congressman and after his terms as the third Jewish mayor of New York City (after Fiorello LaGuardia and Abraham Beame), Koch was a fervent supporter of Israel. He crossed party lines to endorse Rudy Giuliani for mayor of New York City in 1993, Al D'Amato for Senate in 1998, Michael Bloomberg for mayor of New York City in 2001, and George W. Bush for president in 2004.

A popular figure, Koch rode the New York City Subway and stood at street corners greeting passersby with the slogan "How'm I doin'?" He was a lifelong bachelor, had no children and did not come out as gay during his lifetime. A 2022 New York Times article posthumously identified him as gay.

Koch was first elected mayor of New York City in 1977, and he won reelection in 1981 with 75% of the vote. He was the first New York City mayor to win endorsement on both the Democratic and Republican party tickets. In 1985, Koch was elected to a third term with 78% of the vote. His third term was fraught with scandal regarding political associates (although the scandal never touched him personally) and with racial tensions, including the killings of Michael Griffith and Yusuf Hawkins. In a close race, Koch lost the 1989 Democratic primary to his successor, David Dinkins.

Early life 
Koch was born in Crotona Park East section of The Bronx borough of New York City, the son of Yetta (or Joyce, née Silpe) and Louis (Leib) Koch, Polish-Jewish immigrants from Kozliv and Uścieczko in Eastern Galicia. He came from a family of Conservative Jews who resided in Newark, New Jersey, where his father worked at a theater. As a child, he worked as a hatcheck boy in a Newark dance hall. He graduated from South Side High School in Newark in 1941.

In 1943 he was drafted into the United States Army, where he served as an infantryman with the 104th Infantry Division, landing in Cherbourg, France, in September 1944. He earned a European-African-Middle Eastern Campaign Medal with two campaign stars, a World War II Victory Medal, and the Combat Infantryman Badge for service in the European Theater of Operations. After V-E Day, because he could speak German, Koch was sent to Bavaria to help remove Nazi public officials from their jobs and find non-Nazis to take their place. He was honorably discharged with the rank of Sergeant in 1946.

Koch returned to New York City to attend City College of New York, graduating in 1945, and New York University School of Law, receiving his law degree in 1948. Koch was a sole practitioner from 1949 to 1964, and a partner with Koch, Lankenau, Schwartz & Kovner from 1965 to 1968. A Democrat, he became active in New York City politics as a reformer and opponent of Carmine DeSapio and Tammany Hall. In 1962 Koch ran for office for the first time, unsuccessfully opposing incumbent William Passannante, a DeSapio ally, for the Democratic nomination for the State Assembly.

In 1963, Koch defeated DeSapio for the position of Democratic Party leader for the district which included Greenwich Village, and Koch won again in a 1965 rematch. Koch served on the New York City Council from 1967 to 1969.

Career

Elections 
1968

Koch ran for Congress in New York's 17th congressional district after Republican Theodore Roosevelt Kupferman retired. He defeated Republican Whitney Seymour Jr. and Conservative Richard J. Callahan, who partly split the conservative vote. He won 48.5% of the vote to Seymour's 45.6% and Callahan's 5.9%.

1970

Koch was reelected with 62% of the vote, defeating Republican Peter J. Sprague and Conservative Callahan who finished with 32% and 6%, respectively.

1972

In advance of the 1972 elections, Koch's district was redistricted into the 18th district. He defeated Republican Jane Pickens Langley and Socialist Workers nominee Rebecca Finch, 70%–29%–1%.

1973

Koch briefly ran for mayor in 1973, but garnered little support and dropped out before the Democratic primary. He threw his support to State Assemblyman Albert H. Blumenthal, but Blumenthal's bid was derailed by a scandal and he came in third. Comptroller Abraham Beame won the election.

1974

Koch won reelection (with career-best 76.7% of the vote) to the 18th district against John Boogaerts Jr. (Republican, 18.8%), Gilliam M. Drummond (Conservative, 3.7%), and Katherine Sojourner (Socialist Workers, 0.8%).

1976

Koch was again reelected, this time with 75.7% of the vote, defeating Sonia Landau (Republican, 20.1%), and James W. McConnell (Conservative, 4.3%).

1977

Koch announced his campaign for mayor of New York City against incumbent Beame. Koch and future governor Mario Cuomo finished first (19.8%) and second (18.7%) in the Democratic primary, eliminating Beame (18%). In the runoff, Koch defeated Cuomo, 55%-45%.

Koch ran to the right of the other candidates on a "law and order" platform. According to historian Jonathan Mahler, the New York City blackout of July 1977 and the subsequent rioting helped catapult Koch and his message of restoring public safety to front-runner status.

1981

Koch won both the Democratic and Republican nominations and appeared on the ballot with both of their lines. He faced opposition only from third parties. He won 74.6% of the vote, with Unity candidate Frank Barbaro netting next-best 13.3%. John A. Esposito (Conservative) and Mary T. Codd (Liberal) also ran. Koch swept all five boroughs by landslide margins, breaking 60% of the vote in Manhattan and 70% in Brooklyn, the Bronx, Queens and Staten Island.

1982

After incumbent Hugh Carey announced he would not run for reelection, Koch announced his candidacy for governor of New York. Cuomo, who had been elected lieutenant governor, also ran. Koch received the party's endorsement with 61% of the convention vote, but Cuomo won the Democratic primary. The New York Times called Cuomo's victory a "stunning upset" that relied on "an unusual coalition of liberal Democrats, labor, minorities and upstaters". Koch ran strongly in Jewish communities, while Cuomo won black, liberal, and Italian communities by a similar margin. A key to Cuomo's victory was his strong showing in New York City itself; though Koch won the city and its four suburban counties (Rockland, Westchester, Suffolk, and Nassau) as expected, Cuomo kept the margin close and won half of the city's Assembly districts. That, combined with large victories in nearly every upstate county, allowed Cuomo to win. Koch endorsed Cuomo immediately, declaring "what's important to all of us is that we keep a Democrat in Albany." Many say the deciding factor in Koch's loss was an interview with Playboy magazine in which he called the lifestyle of suburbia and upstate New York "sterile" and lamented the thought of having to live in "the small town" of Albany as governor. Koch's remarks are thought to have alienated many voters from outside New York City. Cuomo was elected governor over Republican Lewis Lehrman, and served three terms.

1985

Koch was reelected to a third term in a landslide. He defeated Carol Bellamy (Liberal) and Dian McGrath (Republican/Conservative), 78%-10%-9%, respectively, and was sworn into his third and final term in January 1986. As of 2021, this is the most recent mayoral election in which a Democrat carried Staten Island. During the campaign, Koch visited the Lubavitcher Rabbi Menachem Mendel Schneerson, seeking his blessing and endorsement.

1989

Koch ran for an unprecedented fourth term in 1989. No mayor had ever won a fourth term, though Fiorello La Guardia and Robert Wagner also served three terms, and Wagner attempted to run for a fourth in 1969. Koch lost the Democratic primary to Manhattan Borough President David Dinkins, who finished with 547,901 votes to Koch's 456,313. Dinkins was helped in part by large margins in Manhattan, the Bronx, and Brooklyn, while Koch carried Staten Island and Queens. Dinkins defeated Rudy Giuliani in the general election by a narrow margin, with Giuliani carrying both counties Koch won in the primary. Giuliani won a rematch against Dinkins in 1993.

U.S. Congressional tenure 

Koch was the Democratic U.S. Representative from New York's 17th congressional district from January 3, 1969, until January 3, 1973, when, after a redistricting, he represented New York's 18th congressional district until December 31, 1977, when he resigned to become Mayor of New York City.

Koch said he began his political career as "just a plain liberal", with positions including opposing the Vietnam War and marching in the South for civil rights. In April 1973, Koch coined the term "Watergate Seven" when, in response to U.S. Senator Lowell P. Weicker, Jr.'s indicating that one of the men in Watergate scandal had been ordered in the spring of 1972 to keep certain senators and representatives under surveillance, he posted a sign on his office door reading, "These premises were surveilled by the Watergate Seven. Watch yourself". At about the same time, Koch began his rightward shift toward being a "liberal with sanity" after reviewing the 1973 controversy around then-New York City Mayor John Lindsay's attempt to place a 3,000-person housing project in a middle-class community in Forest Hills, Queens. Koch met with residents of the community, most of whom were against the proposal. He was convinced by their arguments, and spoke out against the plan, shocking some of his liberal allies.

Koch was active in advocating for a greater U.S. role in advancing human rights within the context of fighting Communism. He had particular influence in the foreign aid budget, as he sat on the House Appropriations Subcommittee on Foreign Operations. In 1976, Koch proposed that the U.S. cut off military aid and supplies to the military dictatorship of Uruguay. In mid-July 1976, the CIA learned that two high-level Uruguayan intelligence officers had discussed a possible assassination attempt on Koch by Dirección de Inteligencia Nacional (DINA), the Chilean secret police under dictator Augusto Pinochet. The CIA did not regard these threats as credible until after the September 1976 assassination of Orlando Letelier in Washington, D.C., by DINA agents coordinated by Operation Condor. After that, Director of Central Intelligence George H. W. Bush informed Koch of the threat. Koch subsequently asked both the CIA and the FBI for protection, but none was extended.

Tenure as mayor of New York City

First term 

When Koch took office, the city was reeling from high crime, a devastating blackout, and a fiscal crisis. During his first term, which many considered his best, he instituted austerity measures and moderated the municipal unions, measures that helped bolster the city’s finances during his second term. During his first term, a number of major events occurred in New York City. John Lennon's abrupt assassination sent shock waves around the world. Grief-stricken New Yorkers walked the streets openly crying for days after the shooting, which took place in front of The Dakota, Lennon's place of residence on Manhattan’s Upper West Side. Koch also dealt with the second transit strike, and pushed for the 1980 Democratic National Convention to be in NYC. His first term also saw a sister city relationship begin with Beijing.

Second term 

Among the events of Koch's second term as mayor were the Brooklyn Bridge's 100th anniversary, the appointing of Benjamin Ward as the city's first ever African American police commissioner in 1983, the emergence of AIDS as a public health crisis, extensive media coverage of Bernhard Goetz's shooting of four African American teenagers in the subway in 1984, and the United Nations' 40th anniversary.

Koch often deviated from the conventional liberal line, strongly supporting the death penalty, adding 3,500 officers to the NYPD in the 1980s, and taking a hard line on "quality of life" issues, such as giving police broader powers in dealing with the homeless and signing legislation banning the playing of radios on subways and buses. These positions prompted harsh criticism from the local chapter of the American Civil Liberties Union and many African-American leaders, particularly Reverend Al Sharpton.

In 1984, Koch published his first memoir, Mayor, which became a best-seller and was adapted into an off-Broadway and later Broadway musical, Mayor.

Third term 
In 1986, Koch signed a lesbian and gay rights ordinance for the city after the City Council passed the measure (on March 20), after 15 years of failed attempts by that body to approve such legislation. Despite his overall pro-lesbian and pro-gay-rights stance, he nonetheless backed up the New York City Health Department's decision to shut down the city's gay bathhouses in 1985 in response to concerns over the spread of AIDS. The enactment of the measure the next year placed the city in a dilemma, as it apparently meant that the bathhouses would have to be reopened because many heterosexual "sex clubs"such as Plato's Retreatwere in operation in the city at the time, and allowing them to remain open while keeping the bathhouses shuttered would have been a violation of the newly adopted anti-discrimination law. The Health Department, with Koch's approval, reacted by ordering the heterosexual clubs, including Plato's Retreat, to close as well. Also in 1986, Koch participated in Hands Across America and in the Statue of Liberty's 100th anniversary celebration. The career-ending face-slashing of model Marla Hanson, the paralyzing shooting of NYCPD detective Steven McDonald, crack cocaine and its related gangs, the Robert Chambers "preppie murder" case, the Howard Beach incident, and the racially motivated murder of Yusef Hawkins also happened during Koch's third term.

Koch consistently demonstrated a fierce love for New York City, which some observers felt he carried to extremes on occasion: in 1984 he went on record as opposing the creation of a second telephone area code for the city, claiming that this would divide the city's population; and when the National Football League's New York Giants won Super Bowl XXI in January 1987, he refused to grant a permit for the team to hold their traditional victory parade in the city, quipping famously, "If they want a parade, let them parade in front of the oil drums in Moonachie" (a town in New Jersey adjacent to the East Rutherford site of the Meadowlands Sports Complex, where the Giants play their home games).

In his third term, Koch's popularity was shaken after a series of corruption scandals, touched off by Donald Manes's suicide and the PVB scandal, which revealed that he had acceded to the requests of political allies (most notably Queens Borough President Manes, Bronx Democratic Party official Stanley M. Friedman and Brooklyn Democratic Party chairman Meade Esposito, an American Mafia associate long perceived as New York City's preeminent political leader) to stack city agencies with patronage appointments. There were no allegations that Koch obtained any financial benefit from the corruption, but the scandals undermined Koch's claims that he ran a patronage-free municipal government. Michael Tager attributes the scandals not to Koch's failures but to the steadily declining power of the Democratic machine and its bosses' desperate efforts to reverse the collapse.

In July 1987, Koch proposed banning bicycling on Fifth, Park and Madison Avenues during weekdays, but many bicyclists protested and had the ban overturned.

It has been said that race relations in Koch's last years in office were poor. He became a controversial figure in the 1988 presidential campaign with his public criticism of Democratic candidate Jesse Jackson, who surprised many political observers by winning key primaries in March and running even with the front-runner, Massachusetts Governor Michael Dukakis. As the April New York primary approached, Koch reminded voters of Jackson's earlier anti-Semitic statements, and said that Jews would be "crazy" to vote for Jackson. Koch endorsed Tennessee Senator Al Gore, who had run well in his native South, but hadn't won 20% in a northern state. As Koch's anti-Jackson rhetoric intensified, Gore seemed to shy away from Koch. On primary day, Gore finished a weak third place with 10% of the vote and dropped out of the race. Jackson ran ten points behind Dukakis, whose nomination became assured after his New York win.

Assessments
A 1993 survey of historians, political scientists and urban experts conducted by Melvin G. Holli of the University of Illinois at Chicago ranked Koch as the 15th-worst American big-city mayor to have served between 1820 and 1993.

Post-mayoral years 

In the years following his mayoralty, Koch became a partner in the law firm of Robinson, Silverman, Pearce, Aronsohn, and Berman LLP (now Bryan Cave LLP) and a commentator on politics, as well as reviewing movies and restaurants for newspapers, radio and television. He also became an adjunct professor at New York University (NYU) and the judge on The People's Court for two years (1997–99) following the retirement of Judge Joseph Wapner. In 1999, he was a visiting professor at Brandeis University. Koch regularly appeared on the lecture circuit, and had a high-rated talk show on WABC radio. He also hosted his own online movie review show, The Mayor at the Movies.

A street in southern Tel Aviv was named after Koch in an August 12, 1993, ceremony attended by him alongside prominent Israeli and American dignitaries.

In 2004, together with his sister Pat (also Pauline) Koch Thaler, Koch wrote a children's book, Eddie, Harold's Little Brother; it tells the story of Koch's childhood, when he tried unsuccessfully to emulate his older brother Harold's baseball talents, before realizing that he should instead focus on what he was already good at, which was telling stories and speaking in public.

The New York City Council voted to rename the Queensboro Bridge the Ed Koch Queensboro Bridge on March 23, 2011. Later, city councilman Peter Vallone introduced legislation banning the naming of New York City property after people who are still alive, but the legislation failed.

Koch formed an organization called New York Uprising to push for statewide redistricting reform. In April 2011, he publicly upbraided 42 state legislators he claimed had broken their promises to support redistricting reform.

In May 2011, Koch sat for a portrait by Dmitry Borshch that has been exhibited at the Institute of Oriental Studies of the Russian Academy of Sciences, DePaul University, Brecht Forum, and CUNY Graduate Center, and is included in the Catalog of American Portraits at the Smithsonian's National Portrait Gallery.

"Mayor at the Movies" 
Koch began appearing in weekly movie review segments for an online show, Mayor at the Movies, in the summer of 2009. He was an avid moviegoer who often saw two or three movies a weekend. Although he was invited to private screenings, Koch preferred to see films with a public audience and was often approached by moviegoers who were surprised to find him there. His reviews were outspoken and wry, with his rating system consisting not of stars but of a "plus" for a good film or a "minus" for a bad one. He sought out great documentaries, and had a particular passion for anything of Jewish interest.

He had a particular passion for independent cinema and documentaries, but enjoyed dramas and action films as well. In addition to Mayor at the Movies, his film reviews were regularly featured on The Huffington Post and in the New York newspaper The Villager. Koch also appeared in more than 60 Hollywood films and television shows as himself, including Sex and the City, Spin City, and Double Rush, and also hosted Saturday Night Live. A documentary about his life, Koch, had its world premiere at the Hamptons International Film Festival on October 8, 2012, and was released theatrically on February 1, 2013 (coincidentally, the day of Koch's death).

Political endorsements 
After leaving office, Koch frequently endorsed prominent Republican candidates, including Rudy Giuliani and Michael Bloomberg for mayor, Al D'Amato for U.S. Senate, Peter T. King for U.S. House, George Pataki for governor, and, in 2004, George W. Bush for president. Koch also endorsed Democrats, including Eliot Spitzer for governor in the 2006 election. He endorsed Bill Bradley for president in 2000.

Koch took back his endorsement of Spitzer in the aftermath of the governor's prostitution scandal. He said, "At the time the prostitution episode emerged, I commented that nothing could explain his behavior other than the fact that he had a screw loose in his head. Probably several."

Though Koch supported Giuliani's first mayoral bid, he became opposed to him in January 1996, and began writing a series of columns in the New York Daily News criticizing Giuliani, most frequently accusing him of being authoritarian and insensitive. In 1999, the columns were compiled into the book Giuliani: Nasty Man. He resumed his attacks, and had the book republished, in 2007, after Giuliani announced his candidacy for president. In May 2007, Koch called Giuliani "a control freak" and said that "he wouldn't meet with people he didn't agree with. That's pretty crazy." He also said that Giuliani "was imbued with the thought that if he was right, it was like a God-given right. That's not what we need in a president."

Koch originally endorsed Hillary Clinton for president during the 2008 campaign, then endorsed Democratic nominee Barack Obama in the general election. In his endorsement of Obama, Koch wrote that he felt that (unlike in 2004) both candidates would do their best to protect both the United States and Israel from terrorist attacks, but that he agreed with Obama's domestic policies much more and that the idea of Republican vice-presidential nominee Sarah Palin ascending to the presidency "would scare me". In 2010, he rescinded his support for Obama, saying that Obama could very well harm American–Israeli relations.

Koch endorsed Republican Bob Turner for Congress in 2011 because he "wanted to send a message to Obama to take a stronger position in support of Israel."

In October 2012, Koch told Al Sharpton that after a conversation with Obama about his position on Israel he was satisfied, and endorsed his reelection.

Early in 2013, Koch endorsed Christine Quinn in the Democratic primary for that year's mayoral election.

Other political statements 
Koch often wrote in defense of Israel and against anti-Semitism. He also appeared in the documentary FahrenHYPE 9/11 defending President Bush and the wars in Iraq and Afghanistan and blasting Michael Moore. Koch was quoted in the film saying of Moore's film Fahrenheit 9/11, "It's not a documentary, it's a lie."

Koch praised New York Governor Andrew Cuomo, saying that he had the right approach in reducing government spending and refraining from raising taxes.

Koch was an early supporter of the Iraq War. In July 2007, Koch wrote that he was "bailing out" of his previous support for that war, due to the failure of the United States' NATO allies, and other Arab countries, to contribute to the war effort. Koch wrote, "I would support our troops remaining in Iraq if our allies were to join us. But they have made it clear they will not." He added that the U.S. must still "prepare for the battles that will take place on American soil by the Islamic forces of terror who are engaged in a war that will be waged by them against Western civilization for at least the next 30 years."

On April 8, 2010, Koch wrote a piece in The Jerusalem Post excoriating what he saw as increasing anti-Catholicism in the media, largely made evident by coverage of the priest sex abuse scandals. While denouncing the abuse, Koch wrote, "the procession of articles on the same events are, in my opinion, no longer intended to inform, but simply to castigate." He also wrote that he believed that many in the media, some themselves Catholic, exhibited such anti-Catholicism largely because of their opposition to the Catholic Church's teachings on such issues as abortion, homosexuality, and artificial contraception. He stated that, while he opposed the Church's teaching in all these matters, he firmly believed that the Church had the right to espouse these beliefs and to expect its members to espouse them as well, calling the Church "a force for good in the world, not evil."

Personal life 

Koch was a resident of Greenwich Village for most of his adult life. At the time of his death, he lived at 2 Fifth Avenue, overlooking Washington Square Park.

Sexuality
Koch never married, and rumors about his sexual orientation became an issue in the 1977 mayoral election with the appearance of placards and posters (disavowed by the Cuomo campaign) with the slogan "Vote for Cuomo, Not the Homo." Koch denounced the attack.

In 1989, Koch was interviewed about a book he had coauthored with Cardinal John J. O'Connor. When the interviewer asked Koch to clarify his views on homosexuality relative to O'Connor, Koch responded, "I happen to believe that there's nothing wrong with homosexuality. It's whatever God made you. It happens that I'm a heterosexual." He once told New York magazine, "Listen, there's no question that some New Yorkers think I'm gay, and voted for me nevertheless. The vast majority don't care, and others don't think I am. And I don't give a shit either way!" He was frequently accompanied at political functions by his friend Bess Myerson, who acted as a beard.

A 2022 New York Times article confirmed Koch's homosexuality, based on interviews with close confidants. The Times reported that Koch disclosed his sexuality only to friends he knew were gay, and was only known to have had one long-term relationship, with health care consultant Richard W. Nathan, which Koch ended when he was elected mayor, apparently out of fear that the relationship would become public. In the 1980s, activist and writer Larry Kramer, who was sharply critical of Koch's handling of the AIDS epidemic, unsuccessfully attempted to out him after learning of his relationship with Nathan. This reportedly influenced Koch's insistence on remaining closeted for the duration of his life, as he did not "want to give activists like Mr. Kramer the satisfaction of seeing him come out, after they had tried so hard to see him outed".

Health, death and funeral 
Koch had a mild stroke in 1987, but was able to resume his duties as mayor within about a week. In 2022, his former spokesman, George Arzt, suggested that the anxiety Koch experienced amid efforts to out him during the period caused a decline in his health, which he said might have contributed to the stroke.

Koch experienced some health problems, including heart issues, after his mayoralty, and was frequently hospitalized in the final months of his life. On January 31, 2013, he was admitted to Columbia University Irving Medical Center in Manhattan due to fatigue, where he died from heart failure at 2 a.m. the next day, aged 88. His funeral took place on February 4, 2013, at Temple Emanu-El, a Reform Jewish congregation in Manhattan. Because of Koch's fierce loyalty to Israel, the Israeli Consul-General to New York City spoke. Former president Bill Clinton also addressed the congregation, serving as President Obama's representative. New York City Police Department helicopters gave a fly-over at the service.

Koch purchased a burial plot in Trinity Church Cemetery in April 2008 so that he could be buried in Manhattan. It is the only graveyard in the borough that accepts new burials. He chose to put the last words of the late journalist Daniel Pearl on his tombstone: "My father is Jewish, my mother is Jewish, I am Jewish."

Wit 
A practiced public speaker since his days stumping for Adlai Stevenson, Koch was well known for his quips and one-liners. A few include:
 (On the occasion of his primary loss to David Dinkins) "The people have spoken ... and they must be punished."
 "I'm the sort of person who will never get ulcers. Why? Because I say exactly what I think. I'm the sort of person who might give other people ulcers."
 "If you agree with me on nine out of 12 issues, vote for me. If you agree with me on 12 out of 12 issues, see a psychiatrist."

Works 
 Koch, Edward I. (1980). The Mandate Millstone. US Conference of Mayors. .

See also 
 LGBT culture in New York City
 List of Jewish members of the United States Congress
 List of LGBT members of the United States Congress
 List of LGBT people from New York City
 List of mayors of New York City
 Timeline of New York City, 1970s–1980s

References

Notes

Primary sources 
 Koch, Edward, and Daniel Paisner. Citizen Koch: an autobiography (St. Martin's Press, 1992).
 Koch, Ed. The Koch Papers: My Fight Against Anti-Semitism (Macmillan, 2008).

Further reading 
 Goodwin, Michael, ed. New York Comes Back: The Mayoralty of Edward I. Koch, powerHouse Books, 2005. .
 Harrington, Michael. "When Ed Koch Was Still a Liberal". Dissent (1987): 595–602. online
 Mollenkopf, John H. A Phoenix in the Ashes: The Rise and Fall of the Koch Coalition in New York City Politics. Princeton University Press, 1994.
 Newfield, Jack and Barrett, Wayne. City For Sale: Ed Koch and the Betrayal of New York, London: HarperCollins, 1989. .
 Soffer, Jonathan. Ed Koch and the Rebuilding of New York City (Columbia University Press; 2010) 494 pages.
 Thompson, J. Phillip. "David Dinkins' victory in New York City: The decline of the Democratic Party organization and the strengthening of black politics".  PS: Political Science & Politics (1990) 23#2 pp. 145–148.
 Paterson, David Black, Blind, & In Charge: A Story of Visionary Leadership and Overcoming Adversity. Skyhorse Publishing. New York City, 2020

External links

Interviews
 Voices on Antisemitism Interview with Edward Koch from the U.S. Holocaust Memorial Museum
 
 The Trust Is Gone Opinion piece by Koch, critical of current administration's relationship with Israel
 Interview with Ed Koch: On the 1988 Tompkins Square Park Riots
 Oral history interview with Ed Koch (2008) from Justice in New York: An Oral History (full transcript and audio clips)

News collections 
 
 Podcasts of Ed Koch commentaries at Bloomberg.com

Archives 
 Edward I. Koch Collection  of La Guardia and Wagner Archives – Koch's mayoral records as well as personal papers and photographs
 Notable New Yorkers – Edward I. Koch Biography, photographs, and interviews of Ed Koch from the Notable New Yorkers collection of the Oral History Research Office at Columbia University.
 Ed Koch Threatened with Assassination in 1976 from the National Security Archive (with archival documents)
 FBI Records: The Vault – Edward Erving "Ed" Koch at fbi.gov

|-

|-

|-

|-

|-

1924 births
2013 deaths
20th-century American memoirists
20th-century American politicians
20th-century American male writers
20th-century American LGBT people
21st-century American memoirists
21st-century American male writers
21st-century LGBT people
American film critics
American gay writers
American people of Polish-Jewish descent
Burials at Trinity Church Cemetery
Candidates in the 1982 United States elections
Deaths from congestive heart failure
Democratic Party members of the United States House of Representatives from New York (state)
Gay politicians
Gay military personnel
Jewish American attorneys
Jewish American military personnel
Jewish American people in New York (state) politics
Jewish mayors of places in the United States
Jewish members of the United States House of Representatives
Jews and Judaism in New York City
American LGBT city council members
LGBT Jews
LGBT lawyers
LGBT mayors of places in the United States
LGBT members of the United States Congress
Gay memoirists
LGBT people from New York (state)
Lawyers from New York City
Malcolm X Shabazz High School alumni
Mayors of New York City
New York (state) lawyers
New York City Council members
New York Press people
New York University School of Law alumni
New York University faculty
Operation Condor
People from Greenwich Village
People of Galician-Jewish descent
Politicians from Newark, New Jersey
Politicians from the Bronx
Recycling in New York City
Television judges
United States Army non-commissioned officers
United States Army personnel of World War II
Writers from Manhattan
American Zionists